Amiruddin is both a given name and a surname or patronymic. People with the name include:

Given name
 Amiruddin Ahmad (1895 - after 1956), Bengali politician and jurist

Surname or patronymic
 Ahmad Amiruddin (born 1982), Indonesian footballer
 Mohd Afif Amiruddin (born 1984), Malaysian footballer 
 Nuku Muhammad Amiruddin (1738–1805), sultan of Tidore and a National Hero of Indonesia
 Teguh Amiruddin (born 1993), Indonesian footballer

See also